The  is a Japanese railway line connecting Kaifu Station, Kaiyō and Kannoura Station, Tōyō. Together with JR Shikoku's Mugi Line, it has the official nickname . The company's name is abbreviated to the portmandeau  . Since the line goes through a relatively sparsely populated area, it is under severe business stress, to the point where closure of the line has been proposed.

The railway company commenced operating road–rail vehicles, known as DMV (dual-mode vehicle) in Japan, on the Asato Line from 25 December 2021. The vehicles, 3 heavily-modified Toyota Coasters, are claimed to be the first in the world, will allow through service to areas without rail track laid. In preparation, the rail line was disconnected from the Mugi Line since summer 2019.

History
Japanese National Railways started the construction of the eastern section of the Asa Line in 1959, proposed to reach Muroto, where it would connect with the planned extension of the western section of the Asa line from Kochi.

The first 12 km section to Kaifu opened in 1973, and further construction was undertaken until work was suspended in 1980. In 1988 construction work south of Kaifu was re-started by the Asa Coast Railway Company, the newly founded third-sector company. The Kaifu - Kannoura section, now called the Asatō Line, opened in 1992.

The western portion of the planned Asa Line opened as the Tosa Kuroshio Railway Asa Line to Nahari in 2002. The Kannoura - Nahari section of the proposed Asa line has not been constructed. The proposed stations were None, Muroto, Kiragawa and Tosa-Hane.

Awa-Kainan Station has been transferred to Asa Coast Railway Company since 1 November 2020 for the purpose of constructing the required changeover facilities for the DMV. The railway line was suspended from 1 December 2020 with bustitution services running until the completion of the DMV facilities on 25 December 2021.

DMV

The development of DMV started in 2011 as an alternative to traditional, more expensive, DMU trains for rail lines with limited passengers. In February 2016, Tokushima Prefecture announced its intentions of introducing DMV in commercial operations in the next 10 years.

Construction 
On 10 January 2019, in preparation for the construction of DMV changeover facilities, the parking area and bus terminal near Kannoura Station was relocated 50 m south. On 1 December 2020, bustitution services operated by JR Shikoku Bus commenced between Mugi Station and Kannoura Station while the facilities were being constructed. On 1 February 2021, bustitution services was revised to operate from Mugi Station to Awa-Kainan Station. On 4 November 2021, the Railway Bureau of the MLIT announced the completion of safety inspections and tests of the DMV conducted on the Asato Line. As such, on 10 November 2021, Asa Coast Railway Company announced the date for the planned introduction of DMV services - on 25 December 2021, DMV services commenced operating between Awa-Kainan Station and Kannoura Station.

Services 
Weekday services run from Awa-Kainan Station to Kannoura Station before turning around and traveling down to Shishikui Onsen Roadside Station. On weekends, services instead run toward Cape Muroto along the Asato Line and bus routes.

Basic data
Distance: 10.0 km / 6.2 mi.
Gauge: 1,067 mm / 3 ft. 6 in.
Stations: 4
Double-track line: None
Electric supply: Not electrified
Railway signalling: Simplified automatic

Stations

See also
Tosa Kuroshio Railway Asa Line
List of railway companies in Japan
List of railway lines in Japan
Dual-mode vehicle
Road–rail vehicle
Parliamentary train

References

External links
 Asa Coast Railway Company official website 

Railway lines in Japan
Rail transport in Tokushima Prefecture
Rail transport in Kōchi Prefecture
Japanese third-sector railway lines
Railway lines opened in 1992
Rail and road vehicle
1992 establishments in Japan